Akna may refer to:

 AKNA, a protein and human gene name
 Akna (Inuit mythology), goddess of fertility and childbirth in Inuit mythology
 Akna (Maya mythology), goddess of motherhood and birthing in Maya mythology
 Akna, Azerbaijan, Armenian name for the city of Ağdam
 Lake Akna (Kotayk), a lake in the Geghama mountains, Armenia
 Lake Akna (Armavir), a lake in the Ararat plain, Armenia